Mia Radotić (born 2 December 1984) is a Croatian racing cyclist, who most recently rode for UCI Women's Continental Team . She has competed at the UCI Road World Championships on seven occasions between 2011 and 2019, competing in the road race, time trial, and team time trial events.

Major results
Source: 

2009
 National Road Championships
1st  Time trial
2nd Road race
2010
 2nd Road race, National Road Championships
2011
 National Road Championships
1st  Road race
1st  Time trial
 2nd National Cyclo-cross Championships
2012
 National Road Championships
1st  Road race
1st  Time trial
 1st  National Cyclo-cross Championships
2013
 National Road Championships
1st  Time trial
2nd Road race
 2nd National Cyclo-cross Championships
2014
 National Road Championships
1st  Road race
1st  Time trial
 1st  National Cyclo-cross Championships
 9th Grand Prix de Dottignies
2015
 National Road Championships
1st  Road race
1st  Time trial
 8th Novilon Eurocup
2016
 National Road Championships
1st  Road race
1st  Time trial
 7th SwissEver GP Cham-Hagendorn
 8th Ronde van Gelderland
 9th Grand Prix de Dottignies
2017
 National Road Championships
1st  Road race
1st  Time trial
 5th Tour of Guangxi
 8th Pajot Hills Classic
2018
 National Road Championships
1st  Road race
1st  Time trial
 10th Ljubljana–Domžale–Ljubljana TT
2019
 National Road Championships
1st  Time trial
2nd Road race
 1st  National Cyclo-cross Championships
2020
 National Road Championships
1st  Time trial
2nd Road race
2021
 National Road Championships
1st  Time trial
2nd Road race
2022
 National Road Championships
1st  Time trial
2nd Road race

References

External links

1984 births
Living people
Croatian female cyclists
People from Međimurje County
Cyclists at the 2015 European Games
European Games competitors for Croatia
Cyclists at the 2019 European Games
21st-century Croatian women